The Bulls & the Bees is an EP by American rock band the Melvins, released on March 13, 2012 through Scion A/V for free download. It was also released as a free CD for their May 2012 tour with Unsane and released as a 10" vinyl later that year for the 51/51 tour. On June 2, 2015, an expanded CD containing the Electroretard album was released on Ipecac Recordings.

Music and reception

According to Christopher R. Weingarten of Spin, the EP features experiments with neoclassical and dark ambient styles while also continuing the rock sound of the band's last three LPs.

Track listing

Original EP

Electroretard (2015 CD re-release)

Personnel
King Buzzo – guitar, vocals
Dale Crover – drums, vocals
Coady Willis – drums, vocals
Jared Warren – bass, vocals

Additional personnel
Toshi Kasai – engineer
John Golden – mastering
Mackie Osborne – artwork
Kevin Rutmanis – bass (7–11 on 2015 re-release)
Mark Deutrom – bass (12–13 on 2015 re-release)
Tim Green – engineer (6–11 on 2015 re-release)
Michael Rozon – engineer (6–11 on 2015 re-release)
Joe Barresi – engineer (12–13 on 2015 re-release)

References

External links
 Official website

2012 EPs
Melvins EPs
Albums free for download by copyright owner